Solanum indicum can refer to:

Solanum indicum L., a synonym of Solanum violaceum Ortega
Solanum indicum Roxb., a synonym of Solanum melongena L., eggplant
A number of varieties and subspecies now assigned to Solanum anguivi Lam.